Ulrik Frederik Christian Arneberg (15 June 1829 – 30 October 1911) was a Norwegian jurist and elected official for the Conservative Party.

Biography
Arneberg was born in the village of Vanse in  Vest-Agder, Norway.  His father Ulrik Frederik Arneberg (1795-1835) was the senior priest at Vanse Church (Vanse kirke) in Farsund. After taking artium in 1846, he passed his legal examination  in 1852.

Arneberg  became a proxy for Niels Andreas Thrap who served as the  magistrate in Kristiania (now Oslo) until his death in 1856. In 1861 he became a Supreme Court Attorney, in 1866 assessor  at the  city count of Kristiania and in 1872 the Justiciar. He served as County Governor of Bratsberg Amt (now Telemark) from 1881 to 1889.

He served as a member of the Council of State Division in Stockholm from 13 July 1889. On  1 July 1890, he was appointed Minister of Justice and the Police in Prime Minister Emil Stang's First Cabinet. He held this position until the Stang cabinet  fell on 5 March 1891. In 1892 he was elected to the Norwegian Parliament, representing the constituency of Brevik, located in Telemark where he had formerly been County Governor. He served only one parliamentary term.
After this he was appointed County Governor of Smaalenenes Amt  (now Østfold). He held the position until 1905.

References

1829 births
1911 deaths
People from Vest-Agder
Norwegian jurists
Government ministers of Norway
Members of the Storting
County governors of Norway
Østfold politicians
Conservative Party (Norway) politicians
Ministers of Justice of Norway